Devin André Oosthuizen (born 28 May 1988) is a South African professional rugby union player, who most recently played with the . His regular position is flanker or number eight.

Career

Youth and Varsity Cup rugby

Oosthuizen went to school at HTS John Vorster in Pretoria, where he played for and captained the first team in 2006. He was noticed by the  selectors and he earned a call-up to their Under-18 Craven Week side in the same year.

After school, Oosthuizen joined the Blue Bulls Academy and played for the  side in 2007 and for the s in 2008 and 2009. He was also a key player for university side  in the 2009 Varsity Cup competition; he played in all eight of their matches (starting seven of those) as they reached the semi-final of the competition, before losing 14–38 to eventual champions, .

Blue Bulls

Oosthuizen made his senior debut for the Blue Bulls playing off the bench in their opening match of the 2010 Vodacom Cup season, a 22–17 victory over defending champions  in Kimberley. He marked the occasion by scoring his first senior try, dotting down after thirteen minutes to help his side to a 27–22 victory. He played in all their remaining matches in the pool stages of the competition, with the Blue Bulls winning all seven.

Eastern Province Kings / Southern Kings

However, that was one of only two defeats during the season as they qualified for the semi-finals in second place. However, the Pumas won the return leg in Port Elizabeth 46–28 to ensure the Kings remained in the First Division.

Oosthuizen's most prolific try-scoring campaign was the 2011 Vodacom Cup competition. It proved to be in vain as the Kings lost out on a quarter final spot following a points deduction for fielding ineligible players.

Oosthuizen was part of the South African Kings side that played at the 2011 IRB Nations Cup competition in Romania.

Oosthuizen appeared in all eight of their matches during the 2012 Vodacom Cup season, with the side managing to reach the quarter-final this time. The same two teams battled it out for the 2012 Currie Cup First Division season, with the EP Kings running out 26–25 winners over the Pumas in Port Elizabeth to be crowned First Division champions for the second time in three years. Oosthuizen played on six occasions for the Kings, including the title decider. However, it was a mere consolation as the Kings lost the match 14–53. They couldn't turn around the deficit in the second leg, losing 6–16 to remain in the First Division.

During 2012, Oosthuizen also played in one match for the Kings against a South African Students selection.

With the  entry into Super Rugby in 2013, Oosthuizen was named in the  squad.

Oosthuizen returned to domestic action in the 2013 Currie Cup First Division and made nine consecutive appearances as the Kings reached their fourth final in succession. The 2013 saw a reversal of the 2012 result, with the  running out 53–30 victors. However, they were promoted to the Premier Division anyway following a SARU decision to expand the top tier from six teams to eight teams. In June 2014, he was selected in the starting line-up for the  side to face  during a tour match during a 2014 incoming tour. He played just under an hour of the match as the Kings suffered a 12–34 defeat. He made five appearances in the 2014 Currie Cup Premier Division season, including their final match of the season against the  that saw the Kings pick up their only victory in the competition.

During his five seasons in Port Elizabeth, Oosthuizen made 58 first class domestic appearances, scoring ten tries. He also appeared three times in the IRB Nations Cup and eleven times in Super Rugby.

Free State Cheetahs / Cheetahs

References

South African rugby union players
Eastern Province Elephants players
Southern Kings players
Blue Bulls players
Living people
Afrikaner people
South African people of Dutch descent
1988 births
Rugby union flankers